Clara Sofie Fabricius Rosenhoff (born 16 March 1981) is a Danish singer and songwriter.

Clara Sofie studied at University of Copenhagen graduating with an MSc. degree in Modern Culture and then moved to live in London and New York to break through as a singer and songwriter. She also sang in church choirs Her breakthrough came in June 2010 with her cooperation with house-DJ Rune RK. Their joint single "Når tiden går baglæns" (meaning When time goes backwards) topped the Tracklisten, the Danish Singles Chart for five consecutive weeks, followed by another joint single in 2011 "Lever for en anden" reaching No. 24. The joint album Byen elsker dig (meaning the city loves you) making it to No. 13 in the Danish Albums Chart.

The Danish singer-songwriter and record producer Oh Land (real name Nanna Øland Fabricius) is Clara Sofie's cousin.

Discography

Albums

References

External links
Facebook
LastFM

1981 births
Living people
21st-century Danish  women singers